The 2016 BAIC Motor China Open was a professional ranking snooker tournament, that took place between 28 March and 3 April 2016 at the Beijing University Students' Gymnasium in Beijing, China. It was the ninth ranking event of the 2015–16 season.

Mark Selby was the defending champion, but he withdrew for personal reasons.

Judd Trump defeated Ricky Walden 10–4 in the final to win his fifth career ranking title.

Prize fund
The breakdown of prize money for this year is shown below:

Winner: £85,000
Runner-up: £35,000
Semi-final: £21,000
Quarter-final: £12,500
Last 16: £8,000
Last 32: £6,500
Last 64: £4,000

Televised highest break: £2,000
Total: £510,000

The "rolling 147 prize" for a maximum break stood at £15,000, but was not won.

Wildcard round
These matches were played in Beijing on 28 March 2016.

Main draw

Final

Qualifying
These matches were played from 9–11 February 2016 at the Barnsley Metrodome in Barnsley, England, except for 4 matches which were held over to be played in Beijing on 28 March 2016. All matches were best of 9 frames.

Century breaks

Qualifying stage centuries

 142, 108  Ryan Day
 140  Joe Perry
 137, 123  Anthony Hamilton
 136, 104  Shaun Murphy
 135  Tian Pengfei
 132  Jamie Cope
 132  Neil Robertson
 129  Marco Fu
 128, 109  Barry Hawkins
 125, 108, 103, 100  Kyren Wilson
 125  Lu Ning
 124  Chris Wakelin
 123  Noppon Saengkham
 121  John Higgins
 115  Matthew Stevens

 113  Dominic Dale 
 110  Dechawat Poomjaeng
 108  Judd Trump
 106, 100  Michael Holt
 104  Rhys Clark
 104  Peter Ebdon 
 104  Stephen Maguire
 103, 100  Ben Woollaston
 103  Michael Georgiou 
 103  Robert Milkins 
 102  Mitchell Mann
 101  Mark Joyce
 100  Eden Sharav 
 100  Mark Allen

Televised stage centuries

 143, 128, 119, 109  Stuart Bingham
 136  Ding Junhui
 135  Ian Burns
 135, 131, 113, 108  Ricky Walden
 133, 108  Tian Pengfei
 123, 115, 111  Marco Fu
 120, 103  Zhou Yuelong
 117, 116  Alfie Burden
 116  Mark Joyce
 115, 102  David Gilbert
 114  John Higgins

 110, 109, 100  Judd Trump
 109, 105, 101  Dominic Dale
 106, 106  Neil Robertson
 106  Ben Woollaston
 105  Alan McManus
 102  Yuan Sijun
 101  Stephen Maguire
 101  Ryan Day
 100  Michael Holt
 100  Anthony McGill

Notes

References

China Open (snooker)
China Open
Open (snooker)
China Open
China Open
Sports competitions in Beijing